is a role-playing video game developed and published by Spike Chunsoft, with assistance from tri-Ace, for the PlayStation Vita and PlayStation 4 video game consoles. It was released in Japan in December 2015 and worldwide in October 2016.

Gameplay
The game is a side scrolling role-playing video game. Many journalists considered it a spiritual sequel to the Valkyrie Profile series of games also by tri-Ace.

Story
The player follows twelve youths who are killed by an explosion in modern-day Tokyo and find themselves on the fantasy-like planet of Protolexa. There are three different endings, based on the player's actions over the course of the game, and some actions affect the game's new game plus mode.

Development
The game was first announced in July 2015, as a collaboration between Spike Chunsoft and tri-Ace in a fourteen-page article in Weekly Famitsu. The game will be developed by much of the same tri-Ace staff that had worked on the first Valkyrie Profile game, with assistance from Spike Chunsoft staff as well. Other key staff for the game include character designer Mino Taro of Konamis Love Plus series, and music composer Motoi Sakuraba, composer for tri-Ace's Valkyrie Profile and Star Ocean series. A trailer for the game was shown at the Tokyo Game Show in September 2015. Trailers for each of the game's characters were released over time through Famitsus YouTube channel. The game was first announced to be released on November 26, 2015, before being delayed to its final release date, December 17, 2015. Shortly after the game's Japanese release, Spike Chunsoft announced that there would be downloadable content collaborations some of tri-Ace's other games, including Valkyrie Profile and Star Ocean 5 games. The collaborations, released in March 2016, consisted of character costumes based on character's from the two aforementioned titles, along with a costume to dress up as Monokuma, the primary antagonist from Spike Chunsoft's Danganronpa series of video games.

Until April 2016, no information had been announced in regards to an English language release of the game. NIS America, a frequent publisher for Spike Chunsoft games in English (Danganronpa 1, Danganronpa 2, Danganronpa Another Episode), gave a "no comment" response when asked about localizing the title. On April 25, 2016, Aksys Games announced that they would be localizing Exist Archive for release in North America on October 18, 2016. On September 8, Aksys Games confirmed that it would be released in Europe on the same day as a digital-only release.

Reception

Famitsu gave both the Vita and PS4 versions of the game a 33/40 rating, with the four reviewers giving the title scores of 8/8/8/9. The game sold 37,398 copies in its opening week in Japan, with 17,414 copies sold for PlayStation 4 and 19,984 copies sold for PlayStation Vita.

References

External links

2015 video games
PlayStation Vita games
PlayStation 4 games
Side-scrolling video games
Video games scored by Motoi Sakuraba
Video games developed in Japan
Japanese role-playing video games
Fantasy video games
Tri-Ace
Video games set in Tokyo
Video games set on fictional planets